This is a timeline of the Göktürks from the origins of the Turkic Khaganate to the end of the Second Turkic Khaganate.

5th century

6th century

7th century

8th century

References

Bibliography 
 .

 (alk. paper)

  (paperback).
 

 
 .

 

 

 
 

 
 
  
 

 Timeline
Turkic dynasties
Göktürks